Kevin Ray Sweazea (born 1963) is a magistrate judge of the United States District Court for the District of New Mexico and a former nominee to be a United States district judge of the same court.

Education 

Sweazea earned his Bachelor of Accountancy from New Mexico State University and his Juris Doctor from Baylor Law School.

Legal career 

Early in his career, Sweazea worked for various New Mexico law firms in private practice, where his practice included litigation, regulatory, and transactional matters.  Judge Sweazea has also served as a member of the New Mexico Environmental Improvement Board and Socorro County Land Use Commission.

State judicial career 

Sweazea was appointed to the Seventh Judicial District Court of New Mexico by then Governor Gary Johnson in March 2001. He was retained in the 2002, 2008 and 2014 elections and served ten years as Chief Judge.

Federal judicial service

Magistrate judge tenure 

Sweazea was selected as a magistrate judge on May 3, 2017.

Failed nomination to district court 

On May 29, 2019, President Trump announced his intent to nominate Sweazea to serve as a United States district judge for the United States District Court for the District of New Mexico. On June 12, 2019, his nomination was sent to the Senate. President Trump nominated Sweazea to the seat vacated by Judge Robert C. Brack, who took senior status on July 25, 2018. On October 29, 2019 it was announced that Sweazea withdrew his nomination after opposition from New Mexico's two senators, Tom Udall and Martin Heinrich. On January 3, 2020, his nomination was returned to the President under Rule XXXI, Paragraph 6 of the United States Senate.

See also
Donald Trump judicial appointment controversies

References

External links 
 

1963 births
Living people
Baylor Law School alumni
New Mexico Republicans
New Mexico State University alumni
New Mexico state court judges
People from Corson County, South Dakota
United States magistrate judges
20th-century American lawyers
21st-century American lawyers
21st-century American judges